Suzu Chiba (千葉 すず, born August 11, 1975 in Yokohama, Kanagawa) is a former freestyle swimmer from Japan. She competed for her native country in two consequentive Summer Olympics, starting in 1992. She won the bronze medal in the 400 m Freestyle at the 1991 World Aquatics Championships in Perth, Western Australia.

She married swimmer Takashi Yamamoto in 2002. They have four children together.

References

sports-reference

1975 births
Living people
Japanese female freestyle swimmers
Olympic swimmers of Japan
Swimmers at the 1992 Summer Olympics
Swimmers at the 1996 Summer Olympics
Sportspeople from Yokohama
World Aquatics Championships medalists in swimming
Asian Games medalists in swimming
Swimmers at the 1990 Asian Games
Swimmers at the 1994 Asian Games
Asian Games gold medalists for Japan
Asian Games silver medalists for Japan
Asian Games bronze medalists for Japan
Medalists at the 1990 Asian Games
Medalists at the 1994 Asian Games
20th-century Japanese women